Spiraeoside is a chemical compound. It can be isolated from flowers of Filipendula ulmaria (L.) (a.k.a. Spiraea ulmaria or meadowsweet) or from the garden onion (Allium cepa).

Spiraeoside is the 4'-O-glucoside of quercetin.

References 

Quercetin glycosides
Flavonol glucosides